Heinrici is a surname and less commonly a given name. It is a variant of Henry. People with the surname include:

 Georg Heinrici (1844-1915), German Protestant theologian 
 Gotthard Heinrici (1886-1971), Prussian general in the German Army during the Second World War
 Louis Heinrici (1847-1930), German builder of hot air engines

See also 
 Henrici